This is a list of public art in and around the Indiana Statehouse, the Indiana Government Center North, and the Indiana Government Center South, which make up the Indiana Statehouse Public Art Collection.

References

Indiana Statehouse
Culture of Indianapolis